Billy Bevan (born William Bevan Harris, 29 September 1887 – 26 November 1957) was an Australian-born vaudevillian, who became an American film actor. He appeared in more than 250 American films between 1916 and 1950.

Career
Bevan was born in the country town of Orange, New South Wales, Australia. He went on the stage at an early age, traveled to Sydney and spent eight years in Australian light opera, performing as Willie Bevan. He sailed to America with the Pollard’s Lilliputian Opera Company in 1912, and later toured Canada. Bevan broke into films with the Sigmund Lubin studio in 1916. When the company disbanded, Bevan became a supporting actor in Mack Sennett movie comedies. An expressive pantomimist, Bevan's quiet scene-stealing attracted attention, and by 1922 Bevan was a Sennett star. He supplemented his income, however, by establishing a citrus and avocado farm at Escondido, California.

Usually filmed wearing a derby hat and a drooping mustache, Bevan may not have possessed an indelible screen character like Charlie Chaplin but he had a friendly, funny presence in the frantic Sennett comedies. Much of the comedy depended on Bevan's skilled timing and reactions; the famous "oyster" routine performed on film by Curly Howard, Lou Costello, and Huntz Hall—in which a bowl of "fresh oyster stew" shows alarming signs of life and battles the guy trying to eat it—was originated on film decades earlier by Bevan in the short film Wandering Willies.

By the mid-1920s Bevan was often teamed with Andy Clyde; Clyde soon graduated to his own starring series. The late 1920s found Bevan playing in wild marital farces for Sennett.

The advent of talking pictures took their toll on the careers of many silent stars, including Billy Bevan. Bevan began a second career in "talkies" as a character actor and bit player in roles such as that of a bus driver in the 1929 film High Voltage, a hotel employee in the Mae Murray film Peacock Alley, and the supporting role of Second Lieutenant Trotter in Journey's End in 1930.  His starring roles had come to an end, however, and for the next 20 years he often would play rowdy Cockneys (as in Pack Up Your Troubles with The Ritz Brothers), and affable Englishmen (as in Tin Pan Alley and Terror by Night). He played a friendly bus conductor opposite Greer Garson in one of the opening scenes of Mrs. Miniver.

Bevan died in 1957 in Escondido, California, just before new audiences discovered him in Robert Youngson's silent-comedy compilations. The Youngson films mispronounce his name as "Be-VAN"; Bevan himself offered the proper pronunciation in a Voice of Hollywood reel in 1930.

Filmography

 Salome vs. Shenandoah (1919)
 Distilled Love (1920, Short)
 Married Life (1920) - Hospital Staff / Janitor (uncredited)
 Love, Honor and Behave (1920) - A Fake Lawyer
 A Small Town Idol (1921) - Director
 Home Talent (1921) - Minor Role (uncredited)
 On Patrol (1922) - star policeman then convict
 The Crossroads of New York (1922) - Press Agent
 The Extra Girl (1923) - Comedian
 The White Sin (1924) - Travers Dale
 One Spooky Night (1924) - Man in the Haunted House
 Flirty Four-Flushers (1926, Short) - Jerry Connors / Archibald De Shyster
 Easy Pickings (1927) - The Detective
 The Girl from Everywhere (1927) - Messenger
 Riley the Cop (1928) - Paris Cabman (uncredited)
 High Voltage (1929) - Gus (The Driver)
 Weak But Willing (1929) - George Downing
 The Trespasser (1929) - Reporter (uncredited)
 The Sky Hawk (1929) - Tom Berry
 Peacock Alley (1930) - Walter - Bell Captain
 Journey's End (1930) - 2nd Lt. Trotter
 Temptation (1930) - Sam
 For the Defense (1930) - Drunk (uncredited)
 Monte Carlo (1930) - Train Conductor (uncredited)
 For the Love o' Lil (1930) - Edward O. Walker
 Born to Love (1931) - Departing British Soldier (uncredited)
 The Spy (1931) - Minor Role (uncredited)
 Chances (1931)
 Transatlantic (1931) - Hodgkins
 Waterloo Bridge (1931) - Soldier on the Make (uncredited)
The Silent Witness (1932) - Horace Ward
 Sky Devils (1932) - The Colonel
 Vanity Fair (1932) - Joseph Sedley
 Payment Deferred (1932) - Hammond
 Me and My Gal (1932) - Ashley (uncredited)
 Cavalcade (1933) - George Grainger
 Luxury Liner (1933) - Schultz
 Looking Forward (1933) - Mr. Barker, Night Watchman
 A Study in Scarlet (1933) - Will Swallow
 Peg o' My Heart (1933) - Detective #2 (uncredited)
 Midnight Club (1933) - Detective (uncredited)
 Too Much Harmony (1933) - Stage Director
 The Way to Love (1933) - M. Prial
 Alice in Wonderland (1933) - Two of Spades (uncredited)
 Caravan (1934) - Police Sergeant
 The Lost Patrol (1934) - Hale
 Stingaree (1934) - Mac
 Shock (1934) - Meadows
 One More River (1934) - Cloakroom Attendant
 Bulldog Drummond Strikes Back (1934) - Man in Hotel Room (uncredited)
 The Painted Veil (1934) - Bridegroom (scenes deleted)
 Limehouse Blues (1934) - Herb
 Mystery Woman (1935) - Jepson
 Vanessa: Her Love Story (1935) - Horse Auctioneer (uncredited)
 Black Sheep (1935) - Alfred
 Dressed to Thrill (1935) - Canadian Soldier (uncredited)
 The Last Outpost (1935) - Private Foster
 A Tale of Two Cities (1935) - Jerry Cruncher
 The Widow from Monte Carlo (1935) - Police Officer Watkins (uncredited)
 Song and Dance Man (1936) - Curtis
 Mr. Deeds Goes to Town (1936) - Cabby (uncredited)
 Champagne Charlie (1936) - Mr. Boswick - Ship Bartender (uncredited)
 Dracula's Daughter (1936) - Albert
 Private Number (1936) - Frederick
 Piccadilly Jim (1936) - Taxi Driver
 Lloyd's of London (1936) - Innkeeper
 God's Country and the Woman (1937) - Plug Hat
 Personal Property (1937) - Frank the Waiter (uncredited)
 Slave Ship (1937) - Atkins
 Another Dawn (1937) - Pvt. Hawkins
 The Sheik Steps Out (1937) - Munson
 The Wrong Road (1937) - McLean
 Bringing Up Baby (1938) - Joe - Bartender (uncredited)
 The Girl of the Golden West (1938) - Nick
 Blond Cheat (1938) - The Bartender (uncredited)
 The Young in Heart (1938) - Kennel Man (uncredited)
 Meet the Girls (1938) - Bartender (uncredited)
 Mysterious Mr. Moto (1938) - Customs Official (uncredited)
 Shadows Over Shanghai (1938) - Gallicuddy
 Arrest Bulldog Drummond (1938) - Aquarium Guard (uncredited)
 Up the River (1938) - Bartender (uncredited)
 A Christmas Carol (1938) - Street Watch Leader (uncredited)
 Let Freedom Ring (1939) - Cockney (uncredited)
 Captain Fury (1939) - Duffy
 Grand Jury Secrets (1939) - Masseur (uncredited)
 Pack Up Your Troubles (1939) - British Sergeant (uncredited)
 We Are Not Alone (1939) - Mr. Jones
 The Earl of Chicago (1940) - Guide
 The Invisible Man Returns (1940) - Jim (uncredited)
 Rebecca (1940) - Policeman (uncredited)
 The Long Voyage Home (1940) - Joe - Limehouse Barman (uncredited)
 Tin Pan Alley (1940) - Stage Doorman
 Scotland Yard (1941) - Porter (uncredited)
 Penny Serenade (1941) - McDougal (uncredited)
 One Night in Lisbon (1941) - Lord Fitzleigh's Aide (uncredited)
 Shining Victory (1941) - Chivers
 Dr. Jekyll and Mr. Hyde (1941) - Mr. Weller
 Suspicion (1941) - Ticket Taker (uncredited)
 Confirm or Deny (1941) - Mr. Bindle
 The Man Who Wouldn't Die (1942) - Phillips - the Butler
 This Above All (1942) - Farmer (uncredited)
 Mrs. Miniver (1942) - Bus Conductor (uncredited)
 Hi, Neighbor (1942) - Guest (uncredited)
 Counter-Espionage (1942) - George Barrow
 A Yank at Eton (1942) - Tour Guide (uncredited)
 I Married a Witch (1942) - Puritan Vendor (uncredited)
 London Blackout Murders (1943) - Air Raid Warden
 Forever and a Day (1943) - Wartime Cabby
 Young and Willing (1943) - Phillips
 Holy Matrimony (1943) - Cabby (uncredited)
 The Return of the Vampire (1943) - Horace - Civil Defense Worker (uncredited)
 Jane Eyre (1943) - Bookie (uncredited)
 The Lodger (1944) - Bartender (uncredited)
 Once Upon a Time (1944) - Patrol Cop-Driver (uncredited)
 The Invisible Man's Revenge (1944) - Sergeant
 The Pearl of Death (1944) - Constable (uncredited)
 National Velvet (1944) - Constable (uncredited)
 Tonight and Every Night (1945) - Cabbie (uncredited)
 The Picture of Dorian Gray (1945) - Malvolio Jones - Chairman
 Scotland Yard Investigator (1945) - Porter (uncredited)
 Terror by Night (1946) - Train Attendant
 Devotion (1946) - Mr. Ames (uncredited)
 Cluny Brown (1946) - Uncle Arn Porritt (uncredited)
 Moss Rose (1947) - White Horse Cabby (uncredited)
 Love from a Stranger (1947) - Taxi Driver (uncredited)
 It Had to Be You (1947) -  Evans - the Butler
 The Swordsman (1948) - Old Andrew
 The Black Arrow (1948) - Dungeon Keeper
 Let's Live a Little (1948) - Morton (uncredited)
 The Secret Garden (1949) - Barney
 The Secret of St. Ives (1949) - Douglas (uncredited)
 That Forsyte Woman (1949) - Porter (uncredited)
 Tell It to the Judge (1949) - Winston - Kitty's Butler (uncredited)
 Fortunes of Captain Blood (1950) - Billy Bragg
 Rogues of Sherwood Forest (1950) - Will Scarlet
 Three Secrets (1950) - Ed Jackson (uncredited)
 Hans Christian Andersen (1952) - Town Councilman (uncredited)

Gallery

References

External links 

 
 Billy Bevan at Virtual History

1887 births
1957 deaths
Australian male silent film actors
Silent film comedians
People from Orange, New South Wales
20th-century Australian male actors
20th-century American comedians
Australian emigrants to the United States
Burials at Oak Hill Memorial Park (Escondido)